Witold Leon Julian Zglenicki, coat of arms of Prus II (born January 6, 1850 in Stara Wargawa near Kutno, died July 6, 1904 in Baku, buried in Wola Kiełpińska near Warsaw) - Polish inventor, geologist, metallurgist, oil worker and philanthropist, student of Dmitry Mendeleev. Called the "father of Baku kerosene" and the "Polish Nobel".

The main philanthropist of Polish science - donor of the then Kasa im. Mianowskiego (liquidated in 1951, reactivated in 1991) and the University of Warsaw.

Curriculum vitae 
He studied at the Governor's Gymnasium in Płock (1859-1866), then in the years 1866-1870 he studied at the Mathematics and Physics Department of the Main School of Warsaw (now the University of Warsaw) and in the years 1870-1875 at the Mining Institute (Russian: Горный институт) in St. Petersburg.

During his studies, he decided to devote himself to mining, seeing the oil industry as an important development factor. Initially (1875) he worked at the Mining Works of the Kingdom of Poland in Suchedniów and at the Metallurgical Works in Mroczków (1876–1884), where he operated and modernized blast furnaces for iron smelting. In the years 1884–1890 he ran private forges.

Combining a state function with running his own successful business resulted in reporting him to the Ministry of Treasury. Zglenicki was accused of appropriating state property and dismissed from Mroczków and suspended from his duties as an official. In the following years, he fought to be reinstated. In 1890 he was employed at the Assay Office in Riga; and a year later, in 1891, he was transferred to a similar office in Baku, where he worked until the end of his life. Initially, he was offered a job in the prestigious Donetsk Basin, but after his refusal, he was transferred to Baku, which at the time was subordinate.

As he was passionate about geology, he invested his free time and funds in this activity, searching for oil deposits and new methods of its extraction. He also designed a device for undersea drilling and oil extraction (a drilling rig), becoming an absolute world pioneer in this field. He developed and gave the oil workers a device for measuring the curvature of shafts and a device for measuring the perpendicularity of drilling mining holes. He designated offshore oil plots, specifying their abundance, and established natural deposits in this area. One of the newspapers praised his achievements: "The man who turned Baku into an oil Eldorado". The Shah of Persia, Mozaffar ad-Din Shah Qajar, distinguished him around 1900 with the Order of the Lion and the Sun for his geological discoveries in this country. The Russian authorities also noticed him, promoting him in 1901 to the rank of collegiate counselor (equivalent to the military rank of colonel).

Thanks to the engineer Zglenicki, waterworks were built in Baku, he supported science by helping the Library of the Baku Imperial Branch of the Russian Technical Society, and posthumously (in the years 1909–1912) he co-financed, together with the Rylski family, the construction of a Roman Catholic Church (dedicated to the Blessed Virgin Mary) in Baku, incidentally destroyed in 1938.

In his actions, he is a partner of the Nobel brothers (Alfred, Ludwig and Robert) and the Rothschild family.

He died in Baku, transported by a saloon wagon to Warsaw, and buried in Wola Kiełpińska near Zegrze near Warsaw. His work was continued in the vicinity of Baku by another Pole - Paweł Potocki.

Testament 
Upon learning unexpectedly about his fatal disease - diabetes, which at that time was incurable - he made a will, bequeathing the income from his oil fields to Polish science (and partly also Russian) and other charities.

§8 of the will provided for the creation of a foundation - ″Jozef Mianowski Fund in Warsaw (Kasa im. Mianowskiego w Warszawie), in order to create endowment capital, with the proviso that the interest from this capital should be used to award prizes, at the discretion of the Fund's Board, for the best works on pan-European literature, art and science, like the Nobel Prizes. 
Among other things, the funds
 Słownik geograficzny Królestwa Polskiego (Geographical Dictionary of the Kingdom of Poland),
 Zygmunt Gloger's Encyklopedia staropolska ilustrowana (Old Polish Encyclopedia),
 works of Oskar Kolberg and Samuel Adalberg.
Maria Konopnicka also benefited from the aid. For a short period, the Fund had at its disposal, thanks to Zglenicki, amounts that exceeded the needs of Polish science and culture at that time.

Unfortunately, the will was made only partially with the will of the deceased. After the Bolshevik coup in Russia, the oil fields belonging to the Kasa im. Mianowskiego were expropriated by the Bolsheviks without compensation. In this way, the capital of the "Polish Nobel Prize" ceased to exist.

Private life 
Son: Anatol (1896–1960).

Bibliography
 Andrzej Chodubski: Witold Zglenicki „Polski Nobel” 1850–1904, Płock 1984
 Andrzej Chodubski: Górnik, geolog. Witold Zglenicki (1850-1904) „Polski Nobel”, Płock 2011

References

External links
Biography of "Polish Nobel"

1850 births
1904 deaths
19th-century Polish geologists
People from the Russian Empire of Polish descent
Russian businesspeople in the oil industry
Saint Petersburg Mining University alumni
People from Łęczyca County